The Mark of the Hawk (also called Accused) is a 1957 drama film, directed by Michael Audley with a screenplay by Lloyd Young (better known for his sound work on other films) and H. Kenn Carmichael. The film stars Eartha Kitt and Sidney Poitier.

Synopsis

Obam (Sidney Poitier), brother of an indigenous resistance leader (Clifton Macklin) in British colonial Africa, returns to his troubled homeland after some years abroad, seeking a political post. However, domestic tensions have divided the country into two hostile camps, with many natives demanding the return of their ancestral lands - now farmed by European settlers. Britain and the local white administration are determined not to release their stranglehold; rather than adopting violence Obam seeks racial equality through peaceful means. His motives are frequently questioned by his own people, but with the assistance of an insightful spouse (Eartha Kitt) and sympathetic missionary Bruce Craig (John McIntire), this unlikely newcomer to African nationalism fights to make a meaningful difference before the situation deteriorates further.

Cast
 Eartha Kitt as Renee; performs "This man is mine", Ken Darby composer, partially on screen, partially as backing soundtrack  
 Sidney Poitier as Obam (meaning 'hawk', per running theme of film; a symbol of the nationalist forces) 
 Juano Hernandez as Amugu  
 John McIntire as Bruce Craig  
 Helen Horton as Barbara Craig  
 Marne Maitland as Sandar Lai  
 Gerard Heinz as Governor General  
 Patrick Allen as Gregory  
 Earl Cameron as Prosecutor
 Ewen Solon as Inspector  
 Lockwood West as Magistrate  
 Francis Matthews as Overholt
 Bill Nagy as Fred
 Harold Siddons as Ist Officer 
 Frederick Treves as 2nd Officer

Production notes
 Production Dates: 1957 at Associated British Picture Corp. Studios, Elstree, England
 Although Sidney Poitier is listed fourth, below John McIntire, in the opening credits, he receives second billing in the closing credits. 
 The opening credits include the following written statement: "The producers wish to acknowledge the cooperation extended to them by the Cinema Corporation of Nigeria." The end credits note that the film was "made at Associated British Elstree Studios, England." 
 According to a December 1957 Film Daily item, The Mark of the Hawk was partially shot on location in Nigeria, after which Universal bought the distribution rights.

External links
 
 The Mark of the Hawk - BFI Database entry

1957 films
American drama films
British drama films
Films about racism
Films shot in Nigeria
Films set in the British Empire
Films about race and ethnicity
1957 drama films
1958 drama films
1958 films
Universal Pictures films
1950s English-language films
1950s American films
1950s British films